Anacolosa is a plant genus of 15 to 22 species. In the APG IV system, the genus is placed in the family Olacaceae. Other sources place it in the segregate family Aptandraceae. The generic name is from the Greek anakolos, meaning "knotted", referring to the calyx cup rim.

Description
Anacolosa species grow as shrubs or trees. The flowers are bisexual. The fruits are drupes (pitted) with a thin, fleshy pericarp.

Distribution and habitat
Anacolosa species are distributed throughout the tropics, including Malesia.

Species
, Plants of the World Online accepted the following species:
Anacolosa casearioides Cavaco & Keraudren
Anacolosa cauliflora Sleumer
Anacolosa clarkii Pierre
Anacolosa crassipes (Kurz) Kurz
Anacolosa densiflora Bedd.
Anacolosa frutescens (Blume) Blume
Anacolosa glochidiiformis Kaneh. & Hatus.
Anacolosa griffithii Mast.
Anacolosa ilicoides Mast.
Anacolosa insularis Christoph.
Anacolosa lutea Gillespie
Anacolosa papuana Schellenb.
Anacolosa pervilleana Baill.
Anacolosa poilanei Gagnep.
Anacolosa uncifera Louis & Boutique

References

Olacaceae
Santalales genera
Taxonomy articles created by Polbot